Mia Marie Tarp Møldrup (born 6 April 1991) is a Danish handball player.

References

1991 births
Living people
People from Esbjerg
Danish female handball players
Sportspeople from the Region of Southern Denmark